Xerotrema is a genus of fungi in the family Odontotremataceae. It contains two species. The genus was circumscribed by Martha Allen Sherwood and Brian John Coppins in 1980. The type species, Xerotrema megalospora, is found in the United States and Canada. X. quercicola was added to the genus in 2008.

References

Ostropales
Ostropales genera
Taxa described in 1980
Taxa named by Brian John Coppins